The great Inca finch (Incaspiza pulchra) is a species of passerine bird in the tanager family Thraupidae. It was traditionally placed in the family Emberizidae. It is endemic to Peru.

Its natural habitat is subtropical or tropical high-altitude shrubland.

References

great Inca finch
Birds of the Peruvian Andes
Endemic birds of Peru
great Inca finch
great Inca finch
Taxonomy articles created by Polbot